The Exchequer Bill Loan Commission of the United Kingdom was set up under the Poor Employment Act 1817, to help finance public work projects that would generate employment. Commissioners included Thomas Telford and Francis Ludlow Holt.

The body continued as part of the Public Works Loan Board, but its loans were restricted to twenty years by the Public Works Loans Act 1853.

References

1817 establishments in the United Kingdom
Public inquiries in the United Kingdom